Knox City-O'Brien Consolidated Independent School District is a public school district based in Knox City, Texas (USA).  In addition to Knox City, the district also serves the city of O'Brien. Located in southwestern Knox County, a portion of the district lies in northwestern Haskell County.

In 2009, the school district was rated "academically acceptable" by the Texas Education Agency.

Schools
Knox City High School (Grades 9–12)
1983 Class A state football champions 
O'Brien Middle (Grades 5–8)
previously O'Brien High School, which were the 1972 Texas state champions in six-man football, the first title ever awarded in this classification
Knox City Elementary (Grades PK-4)

Special programs

Athletics
Knox City High School plays six-man football.

See also

List of school districts in Texas

References

External links
 

School districts in Knox County, Texas
School districts in Haskell County, Texas